Behavioral Ecology is a bimonthly peer-reviewed scientific journal published by Oxford University Press on behalf of the International Society for Behavioral Ecology. The journal was established in 1990.

Scope 
Behavioral Ecology publishes empirical and theoretical papers on a broad range of topics related to behavioural ecology, including ethology, sociobiology, evolution, and ecology of behaviour. The journal includes research at the levels of the individual, population, and community on various organisms such as vertebrates, invertebrates, and plants.
 
According to the Journal Citation Reports, the journal has a 2020 impact factor of 2.671, ranking it 22nd out of 175 journals in the category "Zoology".

Article categories 
The journal publishes following types of articles:
 original articles
 reviews
 commentaries

References

External links 
 
 International Society for Behavioral Ecology
 Journal page at the International Society for Behavioral Ecology website

Ethology journals
Ecology journals
Oxford University Press academic journals
Bimonthly journals
Publications established in 1990
English-language journals
Academic journals associated with learned and professional societies